Andy Stein is an American saxophone and violin player. He is a member of The Guys All-Star Shoe Band on the radio show A Prairie Home Companion and the movie. He was a founding member of the country rock band Commander Cody and His Lost Planet Airmen. Stein attended the University of Michigan as a contemporary of George Frayne ("Commander Cody").
 
He has also written a number of film scores, including the soundtracks for Hollywood Boulevard (1976), Thunder and Lightning (1977), Deathsport (1978) and National Lampoon's Movie Madness (1983). He plays the violin in the Ken Burns documentaries The War (2007) and The West (1996).

Andy Stein made arrangements of classical pieces by Franz Schubert and Ludwig van Beethoven: He reworked the String Quartet No. 14, D.810, nicknamed Death and the Maiden, into a symphony for full orchestra (with winds & Timp.), the Fantasia in F minor (Schubert) for piano four-hands into a Fantaisie Concertante for piano and orchestra, and Symphony No. 2 (Beethoven) into an Octet (for clarinet, horn, bassoon, string quartet and double bass.) These arrangements along with his composition "Suite for Two" violin and 'cello were repeatedly performed in the United States as well as Europe.

References

External links
 Official Site

American male saxophonists
Living people
Place of birth missing (living people)
Year of birth missing (living people)
American male violinists
Commander Cody and His Lost Planet Airmen members
21st-century American saxophonists
21st-century American violinists
21st-century American male musicians
University of Michigan alumni